This is a list of the National Register of Historic Places listings in Clay County, Kentucky.

It is intended to be a complete list of the properties on the National Register of Historic Places in Clay County, Kentucky, United States.  The locations of National Register properties for which the latitude and longitude coordinates are included below, may be seen in a map.

There are 4 properties listed on the National Register in the county.  Another property was once listed but has been removed.

Current listings

|}

Former listing

|}

See also

 List of National Historic Landmarks in Kentucky
 National Register of Historic Places listings in Kentucky

References

Clay